George M. John Thorley (birth registered third ¼ 1927 – 12 July 2005) born in Mountain Ash, was a Welsh rugby union and World Cup winning professional rugby league footballer who played in the 1950s and 1960s.

Playing career

International honours
John Thorley won caps for Other Nationalities (RL) while at Halifax circa-1952…60 2-caps, won caps for Wales (RL) while at Halifax 1953…1959 (2?)3-caps, and won caps for Great Britain (RL) while at Halifax in the 1954 Rugby League World Cup against Australia, France, New Zealand, and France.

John Thorley played left-, i.e. number 8, in all four of Great Britain's 1954 Rugby League World Cup matches, including Great Britain's 16-12 victory over France in the 1954 Rugby League World Cup Final at Parc des Princes, Paris on 13 November 1954.

John Thorley also represented Great Britain while at Halifax between 1952 and 1956 against France (1 non-Test match).

Challenge Cup Final appearances
John Thorley played left-, i.e. number 8, in Halifax's 4-4 draw with Warrington in the 1953–54 Challenge Cup Final during the 1953–54 season at Wembley Stadium, London on Saturday 24 April 1954, in front of a crowd of 81,841, and played left- in the 4-8 defeat by Warrington in the 1953–54 Challenge Cup Final replay during the 1953–54 season at Odsal Stadium, Bradford on Wednesday 5 May 1954, in front of a record crowd of 102,575 or more.

Club career
John Thorley played his last game for Dewsbury against Halifax at Thrum Hall, Halifax.

Honoured at Halifax
John Thorley is a Halifax Hall Of Fame Inductee.

Genealogical information
John Thorley's marriage to Avona M. (née Rathmell (birth registered during third ¼  in Pontypridd district)), a teacher and active in the British Polio Fellowship, was registered during fourth ¼ 1952 in Pontypridd district. They had children; Steven M. S. Thorley (birth registered during third ¼  in Calder district), and Elizabeth Anna Thorley (birth registered during fourth ¼  in Halifax district).

Outside of rugby
After retiring from playing, John Thorley became a keen supporter of Halifax, he also took up golf and was a member of Halifax West End Golf Club  for more than 30 years, was involved in the Welsh Rugby League Past Players organisation, was deputy churchwarden at Halifax Parish Church, and spent a lot of time holidaying with his wife in the south of France.

References

External links
!Great Britain Statistics at englandrl.co.uk (statistics currently missing due to not having appeared for both Great Britain, and England)
Statistics at neathrugby.co.uk
Cardiff RFC Season Review 1951 - 1952

1927 births
2005 deaths
Dewsbury Rams players
Footballers who switched code
Glamorgan County RFC players
Great Britain national rugby league team players
Halifax R.L.F.C. players
Neath RFC players
Other Nationalities rugby league team players
Rugby league players from Mountain Ash, Wales
Rugby league props
Rugby union players from Mountain Ash, Wales
Wales national rugby league team players
Welsh rugby league players
Welsh rugby union players